California Northstate University College of Medicine (CNUCOM) is a private for-profit medical school located in Elk Grove, California, and is one of the four colleges of California Northstate University, granting the degree of Doctor of Medicine (MD). Although the proposed California Northstate University hospital will operate on a not-for-profit basis, CNUCOM will remain a for-profit educational institution. The college of medicine was approved by the WASC in August 2013  and gained preliminary accreditation in June 2015 and provisional accreditation in June 2019 by the Liaison Committee on Medical Education (LCME). In January 2022, the LCME denied CNUCOM full accreditation status; the school will remain provisionally accredited until further evaluation. California Northstate currently lacks authorization through the Higher Education Act title IV, Student Assistance section or Title 38 of the Veterans Benefit Program. This impacts access to Federal Student Loans, any Federal Student Funding, access to refinancing, and limits to currently 3 lenders.

Dr. Joseph Silva, MD, currently serves as the Dean of Medicine. CNUCOM enrolled its first class of 60 students in August 2015, which subsequently graduated in May 2019.

History
California Northstate University (CNU) COM is a new institution established following the College of Pharmacy in 2008. CNUCOM enrolled its first class of 60 students in August 2015, and its second class of 90 students in August 2016. CNUCOM is dedicated to educating, developing, and training physicians to help with the primary care physician shortage in Northern California. CNU has a College of Health Sciences for undergraduates with a combined BS/MD program as well as a pre-med post-Baccalaureate program.

Hospitals
California Northstate University College of Medicine is affiliated with Kaiser Permanente of Northern California and Sutter Health Hospitals. Clinical clerkships are located at multiple sites in Northern California, including but not limited to Kaiser Permanente, Dignity Health, and Sutter Health hospitals. In addition, some students are required to do rotations in Bakersfield and Los Angeles at Good Samaritan Hospital and AHMC, respectively.

On Dec 20, 2018, the California Northstate University Medical Center was announced. It was expected to open in 2022, in Elk Grove, with 250 beds and a level 2 trauma center in the ER. This $750 million project is expected to generate 24,000 jobs and $4.04 billion over the next 10 years. The plan was rejected by the Elk Grove Planning Commission in early 2021 and alternate sites were proposed.  In mid-June 2021, the school announced its medical center would be built on property near Interstate 5 formerly known as the Sleep Train Arena in Sacramento, California.  http://www.egcitizen.com/news/cnu-hospital-once-slated-for-elk-grove-to-be-built-in-sacramento/article_d0ff5386-d5dd-11eb-90ac-47aeda1e1240.html

Probation 
on March 1, 2022, The Liaison Committee on Medical Education, a national accrediting body, placed California Northstate University College of Medicine on probation for a lack of diversity. The university's student body is largely of Asian descent, with an    Asian student population at 60%-67%. Although, the Statewide Population is closer to 13.9% according to a March 3 report by The Sacramento Bee Becker's Hospital Review and The Elk Grove Citizen

Provisional Accreditation
In 2019 the university received provisional accreditation — a step down from full accreditation. About a year prior, three students filed a class action lawsuit, accusing the school of fraud when it promised medical school admission to students who had enrolled in an undergraduate program, then denied their admission. In 2019, the State Of California ordered the university to stop offering two programs designed to "fast-track" students into medical careers reported by Becker's Hospital Review. The university received additional citations for its reporting on job placement rates for its graduates and lack of availability of records when BPPE staff inspected California Northstate in April 2018. Fines for the alleged violations total $6,501.

See also
 List of medical schools in the United States

References

https://www.bizjournals.com/sacramento/news/2018/12/20/new-hospital-to-be-built-in-elk-grove.html

Private universities and colleges in California
Educational institutions established in 2013
2013 establishments in California
Elk Grove, California
Education in Sacramento County, California